Zürich Brunau is a railway station in the Swiss city of Zürich. The station is on the Sihltal line which is operated by the Sihltal Zürich Uetliberg Bahn (SZU).

The station is served by the following passenger trains:

References

External links 
 

Brunau